The Indemnity Act 1727 (1 Geo. II, c. 23) was an Act of Parliament passed by the Parliament of Great Britain during the reign of George II. It relieved Nonconformists from the requirements in the Test Act 1673 and the Corporation Act 1661 that public office holders must have taken the sacrament of the Lord's Supper in an Anglican church.

Notes

Great Britain Acts of Parliament 1727